Dioryctria vancouverella is a species of snout moth in the genus Dioryctria. It was described by Akira Mutuura, Eugene G. Munroe and Douglas Alexander Ross in 1969, and is known from southern British Columbia, Canada. It is named for the city of Vancouver, from which the type specimen was collected.

References

Moths described in 1969
vancouverella